The Falkland Islands competed at the 2022 Commonwealth Games in Birmingham, England between 28 July and 8 August 2022. It was their eleventh appearance at the Games.

Badminton athlete Doug Clark and lawn bowler Daphne Arthur-Almond were the country's opening ceremony flagbearers.

Competitors
The following is the list of number of competitors participating at the Games per sport/discipline.

Badminton

Nine players were officially selected as of 20 June 2022.

Singles

Doubles

Cycling

One cyclist was officially selected as of 23 June 2022.

Road
Men

Lawn bowls

Four players were officially selected on 2 February 2022. A fifth player was added at a later date.

Men

Women

Table tennis

The Falkland Islands accepted a Bipartite Invitation for the table tennis competition and selected Javier Sotomayor to compete.

References

External links
Falkland Islands Overseas Games Association archive

Nations at the 2022 Commonwealth Games
Falkland Islands at the Commonwealth Games
2022 in the Falkland Islands